Star Alliance is the world's largest global airline alliance. Founded on 14 May 1997, its headquarters are located in Frankfurt am Main, Germany, and Jeffrey Goh is its CEO.  , Star Alliance is the largest of the three global alliances by passenger count with 762.27 million, ahead of both SkyTeam (630 million) and Oneworld (528 million). Its slogan is "The Way the Earth Connects".

Star Alliance's 26 member airlines operate a fleet of approximately 5,033 aircraft, serving more than 1,290 airports in 195 countries on more than 19,000 daily departures. The alliance has a two-tier rewards program, Silver and Gold, with incentives including priority boarding and upgrades. Like other airline alliances, Star Alliance airlines share airport terminals (known as co-locations), and many member planes are painted in the alliance's livery.

History

1997–1999: First alliance

On May 14, 1997, an agreement was announced forming the Star Alliance with five airlines on three continents: United Airlines, Scandinavian Airlines, Thai Airways International, Air Canada, and Lufthansa. The alliance chose Young & Rubicam for advertising, with a budget of $25 million (€18 million). The airlines shared the star logo from the beginning, with its five points representing the founding airlines. The alliance adopted its first slogan, "The Airline Network for Earth", with its goal "an alliance that will take passengers to every major city on earth".

Additions 
The now defunct Brazilian airline VARIG joined the Star Alliance network on 22 October 1997, extending the alliance into South America. Also joining were Ansett Australia and Air New Zealand, expanding Star Alliance to Australia and the Pacific. With the addition of the latter two carriers, the alliance served 720 destinations in 110 countries with a combined fleet of 1,650 aircraft. The next airline to join was All Nippon Airways (ANA), the group's second Asian airline, on 15 October 1999.

2000–2006: Expansion
During the early 2000s, a number of airlines joined Star Alliance; the Austrian Airlines Group (Austrian Airlines, Tyrolean Airways and Lauda Air) joined on 26 March 2000 and Singapore Airlines on 1 April. BMI (British Midland) and Mexicana joined on 1 July, bringing the alliance's membership to 13. With Singapore Airlines' entry into the alliance, Thai Airways considered moving to OneWorld, but eventually decided to remain. The addition of BMI made London Heathrow the only European hub with two alliances. During the year, Emirates considered joining Star Alliance, but decided against it. That year the now-defunct BWIA West Indies Airways, which had entered an alliance with United Airlines, considered becoming a member but did not. In 2000, the alliance also opened its first three business centers (in Los Angeles, Frankfurt, and Bangkok) and announced the formation of an Alliance Management Team (AMT), the partnership's executive body. In September 2001, Ansett Australia (the alliance's only Australian member) left Star Alliance due to bankruptcy, giving most of the Australian market to Qantas (a Oneworld member). That year, Star Alliance announced the appointment of a new CEO, Jaan Albrecht.

Partner airlines promoted Star Alliance brand with a ‘Round the World’ ticket (RWT) that offered choice of 19,000, 21,000, and 23,000 miles with stopover of 15 cities valid for one year. RWT was path-breaking in that travel buffs could visit destinations of their choice by charting a yearlong itinerary without disrupting work commitments. Until then tourists took annual vacation of two or three weeks, often settling for lesser-known destinations because flights were overbooked during peak holiday season.  Customer loyalty ratings went up, driven by the underlying message - Forget about the countries and cities. Go where RWT ticket takes you!

Asiana Airlines joined the alliance on 1 March 2003, Spanair on 1 May, and LOT Polish Airlines (Poland's flag carrier) in October.
Around this time, Mexicana Airlines left the alliance after deciding not to renew a codeshare agreement with United Airlines, later joining Oneworld. US Airways joined the alliance in May 2004, becoming its second US-based airline. In November Adria Airways, Blue1 and Croatia Airlines joined the alliance as its first three regional members.

Although Star Alliance invited Lineas Aereas Azteca in 2005 to join in mid-2007, the airline filed for bankruptcy. TAP Air Portugal joined on 14 March 2005, adding African destinations to the network. In April 2006, Swiss International Air Lines, the alliance's sixth European airline, and South African Airways (its first African carrier) became the 17th and 18th members.

2007: First decade
By May 2007, Star Alliance's 10th anniversary, its members had a combined 16,000 daily departures to 855 destinations in 155 countries and served 406 million passengers annually. The alliance introduced Biosphere Connections, a partnership with UNESCO, the International Union for Conservation of Nature (IUCN), and the Ramsar Convention on Wetlands to promote environmental sustainability.

VARIG left the alliance on 31 January 2007, and the two Chinese airlines, Air China and Shanghai Airlines, joined on 12 December.

2008–2010: Second decade of operations
On 1 April 2008, Turkish Airlines joined the alliance after a 15-month integration process beginning in December 2006, becoming its 20th member. EgyptAir, Egypt's national airline and Star Alliance's second African carrier, joined on 11 July 2008.

On 27 October 2009, Continental Airlines became the 25th member of Star Alliance after leaving SkyTeam three days earlier. According to alliance CEO Jaan Albrecht, "Bringing Continental Airlines into Star Alliance has been a truly unique experience. This is the first time an airline has moved directly from one alliance to another, and I would like to thank all those involved in ensuring a smooth switch". At the time, it was rumoured that the switch was Continental's first move in a planned merger with United Airlines. Two months later, Brussels Airlines joined the alliance.

Brazilian carrier TAM Airlines joined Star Alliance on 13 May 2010, increasing its foothold in South America. Aegean Airlines, Greece's largest airline by number of passengers, joined on 30 June.

Shanghai Airlines left the alliance on 31 October 2010 when it merged with China Eastern Airlines, a SkyTeam member. On 29 September, the chief executive board approved Ethiopian Airlines as Star Alliance's 30th member, though Ethiopian did not officially join the alliance until December of the following year. In 2010 the alliance flew to 1,172 airports in 181 countries, with about 21,200 daily departures.

2011–present: further expansion and stability

Since 2011, the alliance has gained several large members but has lost others due to collapse or mergers. On 13 December 2011, Ethiopian Airlines joined, adding five countries and 24 destinations to the alliance's map.

Star Alliance saw a tumultuous 2012–13, starting with two key departures but ending with a major move into Latin America.  In Europe, Spanair ceased operations, and BMI left after being acquired by International Airlines Group (IAG), the parent company of Oneworld members Iberia and British Airways. BMI was integrated into British Airways. In North America, Continental merged with United Airlines, reducing Star's membership further, even if it effectively stayed in the alliance after the merger. On 21 June, though, Avianca, TACA Airlines and Copa Airlines joined, massively increasing the alliance's Latin American presence. In November, Blue1 left after becoming an affiliate of parent Scandinavian Airlines. and Shenzhen Airlines joined, augmenting Air China's Chinese network. Taiwanese carrier EVA Air then joined on 18 June 2013, and after TACA's integration into Avianca, the alliance grew to 28 members, making it the largest of the three major airline alliances. On 13 December, Air India was again invited to begin an integration process with Star Alliance and joined the alliance on 11 July 2014.

Following this string of expansions, 2014 opened with two major departures through mergers.  First, Brazilian carrier TAM Airlines merged with LAN Airlines to become LATAM Airlines Group, leaving the alliance without a presence in the world's fifth-largest country. Next, US Airways completed its merger with American Airlines and also left the alliance. Both parent companies stayed with Oneworld.  On 24 June, though, the alliance finally approved Air India, which joined on 11 July, leaving the alliance at 27 members.

Future expansion centers around the addition of Connecting Partners, subsidiaries or partners of alliance members which will add connectivity to the alliance without becoming full members. Avianca Brasil joined in this way on 22 July 2015, bringing the alliance back into the Brazilian market and partially filling the void left by TAM. South African Airways' low-cost subsidiary, Mango, was initially announced to join as a Connecting Partner in Q3 2016 but has since been delayed. Juneyao Airlines, which codeshares with Shenzhen Airlines, joined as a Connecting Partner on 23 May 2017. Thai Smile, subsidiary of Thai Airways, joined as a Connecting Partner in February 2020. On 20 August 2019, Star Alliance announced affiliate member Avianca Brasil's exit from the alliance from 1 September 2019. The departure, however, won't affect Avianca's membership. On 30 September 2019, Adria Airways ceased operations, and the airline exited the alliance on 2 October 2019.

On 16 November 2020, Asiana Airlines announce their plans to exit the alliance. Asiana will merge with Korean Air, the Korean Government confirmed, in a $1.6 billion acquisition by the SkyTeam member.

In 2022, Lufthansa announced plans to buy 40% stake in ITA Airways, a SkyTeam member. If this goes through, then the latter can become a member of Star Alliance.

Member airlines and affiliates

Members and affiliates

Founding member.
Air Canada Express flights are operated by Jazz Aviation.
TAP Express flights are operated by Portugália Airlines and White Airways.
United Express flights are operated by Air Wisconsin, CommutAir, GoJet Airlines, Mesa Airlines, Republic Airways, and SkyWest Airlines.
Olympic Air, UNI Air, Air Dolomiti, and AnadoluJet are wholly owned regional subsidiaries that operate flights for their parent company under a different name.
Majority owned by Air China.

Connecting Partners

As a subsidiary of Thai Airways International, Thai Smile was originally as an affiliate member, but it transferred as Connecting Partners since 2020.

Intermodal partners
Starting from August 2022, the German railway provider Deutsche Bahn will be the first intermodal partner of the Star Alliance, whose airlines will in future be able to assign their own flight numbers for trains.

Former members

Former affiliates of current members

Customer service

Codeshare flights of Star Alliance airlines are consistent. This cooperation led to suspicions of anti-competitive behaviour; the alliance was suspected by the European Union of being a virtual merger of its members, and speculation existed that if government regulations were relaxed the members would merge into one corporation.

Star Alliance developed a "regional" concept in 2004, which helped it penetrate markets with participation by smaller regional carriers. Regional Star Alliance members had to be sponsored by an alliance member. The alliance no longer designates airlines as "regional" members, now referring to its 27 airlines as "members".

In 2007, alliance members flew 18,521 daily flights to 1,321 airports in 193 countries with a fleet of 4,025 aircraft. Its members carried a total of 627.52 million passengers, with revenue of US$156.8 billion (€145 billion). It had 28 percent of the global market based on revenue passenger kilometres (RPK), greater than the combined market share of all airlines not in one of the three major alliances. All alliance carriers combined employed over 405,000 pilots, flight attendants, and other staff.

Premiums
Star Alliance has two premium levels (Silver and Gold), based on a customer's status in a member's frequent-flyer program. Member and regional airlines recognize Star Silver and Gold status, with a few exceptions mostly about airport lounge access. Membership is based on the frequent-flyer programs of the individual airlines. Many members have a premium status with their individual airline program that goes beyond Gold, however these levels are all grouped together as Gold status when being recognized by Star Alliance overall.

Star Alliance Silver
Silver Status recognizes that customers having shown loyalty to Star Alliance member airlines and earns them two privileges that can make their journeys smoother. This includes priority reservations waitlist and priority airport stand-by.

Star Alliance Gold
Star Alliance Gold status is given to customers who have reached a higher level of a member airline's frequent-flyer program. Benefits are priority reservations waitlist, airport stand-by, check-in and baggage handling; an additional checked luggage allowance of 20 kg (or one extra piece, where the piece rule applies), and access to designated Star Alliance Gold lounges the day and place of departure with the presentation of a Star Alliance boarding pass. Some airlines also offer preferred seating (an exit seat or a special section of the plane); guaranteed seating on fully booked flights, subject to the booking class code and notice period, and free upgrades in the form of a voucher, certificate or automatic upgrade at check-in. United restricts US lounge access for their Gold Members to long-haul international passengers; Gold members from other carriers are welcome in US lounges run by United on all itineraries.

Qualifying tiers by airline

Livery and logo
Some Star Alliance members paint some of their aircraft with the alliance livery, usually, a white fuselage with "Star Alliance" across it and a black tail fin with the alliance logo; the colour or design of the engine cowlings or winglets remains, depending on the member's livery. Singapore Airlines and Air New Zealand are two exceptions, both formerly keeping its logo on the tails of its aircraft but for Singapore Airlines, it now using the Star Alliance logo on white tails; and for Air New Zealand, it now using full black livery with reversed colored original Star Alliance livery elements. Asiana Airlines was the first Star Alliance member to paint its aircraft in the current Star Alliance livery. Aircraft painted in an airline's regular livery have the Star Alliance logo between the cockpit and the first set of cabin doors.

References

External links

 Official website

 
1997 in aviation
Airline alliances
Organisations based in Frankfurt
Organizations established in 1997
Airlines established in 1997
1997 establishments in Germany